Inchelium School District No. 70 is a public school district in Ferry County, Washington and serves 1,202 residents in the town of Inchelium and part of the Colville Indian Reservation.

In March 2011, the district had an enrollment of 196 students.

Schools

Secondary schools
 Inchelium High School
 Inchelium Alternative High School

Primary schools
 Inchelium Middle School
 Inchelium Elementary School

External links
 Inchelium School District No. 70
 Inchelium School District Report Card
 Inchelium School District Enrollment

School districts in Washington (state)
Education in Ferry County, Washington